The  is an AC electric multiple unit (EMU) train type operated on commuter and local services by Kyushu Railway Company (JR Kyushu) in Japan since 2001. The design was based on the earlier 815 series, with transverse seating replacing the previous longitudinal seating, although later variants reverted to longitudinal seating.

Variants
There are five sub-series variants, 817-0, 817-1000, 817-1100, 817-2000, and 817-3000 series, allocated to five depots, Kagoshima, Kumamoto, Minami-Fukuoka, Nagasaki, and Nōgata. The trains carry large colour-coded stickers next to the passenger doors according to the depot.
  Kagoshima (817-0 series): Blue
  Kumamoto (817-0 series): Green
  Minami-Fukuoka (817-3000 series): Orange
  Nagasaki (817-0 series): Red
  Nōgata (817-1000, 817-1100, 817-2000 series): Yellow

817-0/-500 series

31 two-car sets (V001 to V031) were delivered to Minami-Fukuoka and Nōgata depots between August September 2001 for use on the newly electrified Fukuhoku Yutaka Line, Nagasaki Main Line, and Sasebo Line.

The 31 sets were later reallocated to Kagoshima, Kumamoto, and Nagasaki depots from 2003 following the arrival of 817-1000 series sets.

In fiscal 2020, set V004's transverse seating was replaced with longitudinal seating. It was given the classification 817-500 series and renumbered V504.

Formation

The KuMoHa 817 car is fitted with a PS401K single-arm pantograph.

Interior
Seating is arranged in a transverse configuration, with flip-over seat backs to face the direction of travel. The KuHa 816 car has a toilet and a wheelchair space.

817-1000/-1500 series

12 second-batch 817-1000 series two-car sets (V101 to V112) were delivered to Nōgata depot between August and September 2003, displacing the earlier 817-0 series sets based there. These sets were designed to be able to be lengthened easily to three-cars sets in the future if needed. A further two third-batch sets (V113 and V114) were added in February 2005.

In 2022, set V109's transverse seating was replaced with longitudinal seating. It was given the classification 817-1500 series and renumbered V1509.

Formation

The KuMoHa 817 car is fitted with a PS401K single-arm pantograph.

Interior
As with the 817-0 series, seating is arranged in a transverse configuration, with flip-over seat backs to face the direction of travel. The KuHa 816 car has a toilet and a wheelchair space.

Experimental battery EMU set
In March 2013, JR Kyushu converted two-car 817-1000 series set VG114 to a battery electric multiple unit (BEMU) by adding lithium-ion storage batteries to enable the train to run on non-electrified lines. The train has a maximum speed of  when running off the 20 kV AC overhead power supply of electrified lines, and  when running on battery power over non-electrified lines. The train was tested on non-electrified lines from September 2013.

817-1100 series

Four fourth-batch two-car 817-1100 series sets (V1101 to V1104) were delivered to Nōgata depot in March 2007 to provide increased capacity on the Fukuhoku Yutaka Line. These were based on the earlier 817-1000 series, but with larger LED destination indicators on the cab ends.

Formation
, the fleet consists of four two-car 817-1100 sets (V1101 to V1104), all based at Nōgata Depot, and formed as shown below.

The KuMoHa 817 car is fitted with a PS401K single-arm pantograph.

817-2000 series

Six fifth-batch 817-2000 series two-car sets (V2001 to V2006) were delivered to Nōgata Depot from January 2012 for introduction on the Fukuhoku Yutaka Line from the start of the revised timetable on 17 March 2012. These sets have white-painted bodysides, and feature longitudinal seating to provide increased overall capacity and relieve overcrowding on the line. These sets feature interior LED lighting. They operate at a maximum speed of 100 km/h, although they have a maximum design speed of 120 km/h. A seventh set, V2007, was delivered in February 2013.

Formation
, the fleet consists of seven two-car 817-2000 sets (V2001 to V2007), all based at Nōgata Depot, and formed as shown below.

The KuMoHa 817 car is fitted with a PS401K single-arm pantograph. The KuHa 816 car has a toilet.

817-3000 series

Five fifth-batch 817-3000 series three-car sets (V3001 to V3005) were delivered to Minami-Fukuoka depot from January 2012 for introduction on the Fukuhoku Yutaka Line from the start of the revised timetable on 17 March 2012. As with the 817-2000 series, these sets have white-painted bodysides, and feature longitudinal seating to provide increased overall capacity and relieve overcrowding on the line. These sets feature interior LED lighting. Four more sets, V3006 to V3009, were delivered in February 2013. Two more sets were delivered in March 2015.

Formation
, the fleet consists of 11 three-car 817-3000 sets (V3001 to V3011), all based at Minami-Fukuoka Depot, and formed as shown below.

The MoHa 817 car is fitted with a PS401K single-arm pantograph. The KuHa 817 car has a toilet.

Interior

References

External links

 July 2014 RTRI report on evaluation of the experimental battery EMU set 

Electric multiple units of Japan
Kyushu Railway Company
Train-related introductions in 2001
Hitachi multiple units
20 kV AC multiple units